Juhana Aho (born September 30, 1993) is a Finnish professional ice hockey goaltender currently playing for Jukurit of the Liiga.

Aho made his Liiga debut for Jukurit during the 2017–18 Liiga season. He previously played in the Mestis for Jukurit as well as JYP-Akatemia, SaPKo and Imatran Ketterä. He also had a spell in the Erste Bank Eishockey Liga (EBEL) in Austria in 2019 for Dornbirner EC.

References

External links

1993 births
Living people
Dornbirn Bulldogs players
Finnish ice hockey goaltenders
JYP-Akatemia players
Imatran Ketterä players
Mikkelin Jukurit players
Sportspeople from Jyväskylä
SaPKo players
21st-century Finnish people